Pamela Mary Trohear also known as Pam Trohear (born 9 January 1955) is a former Irish woman cricketer. She made her WODI debut against Australia in 1987. Pamela has played for Ireland in 2 Women's ODIs.

References

External links 
 

1955 births
Living people
Irish women cricketers
Ireland women One Day International cricketers
People from Downpatrick
Sportspeople from County Down